There are several broadcasting facilities in Berlin, more than in other comparable cities. This is because Berlin was a divided city from 1961 to 1989 and because the Allies built their own broadcasting facilities in each sector. Further there was the necessity for a directional radio service to West Berlin.

Fernsehturm (TV, FM, directional radio)
Richtfunkstelle Berlin-Frohnau (directional radio, not used for broadcasting)
Fernmeldeturm Berlin (Berlin Telephone Tower, FM, TV, directional radio)
Radio mast Berlin-Olympiastadium (FM, mobile phone services)
Transmitter Berlin-Britz (AM, FM)
Funkturm Berlin (mobile phone services, not used for broadcasting)
Radio mast Berlin-Scholzplatz (FM, TV, mobile phone services)
Transmitter Berlin-Alley of Stallupone (AM, shut down)
Berlin-Müggelberge TV Tower (directional radio services)

Demolished facilities
Transmitter Berlin-Tegel (AM)
Transmitter Berlin-Koepenick (AM, FM)

Buildings and structures in Berlin